The Delaware Otsego Corporation (DO) is an American railway holding company which owns the New York, Susquehanna and Western Railway and the Central New York Railroad. It is headquartered in Cooperstown, New York in Otsego County.

The company was established in 1965 as the Delaware Otsego Railroad by Walter G. Rich, and was once known for operating a successful family of short line railroads throughout New York and New Jersey which was 
collectively known as the DO System. The New York, Susquehanna and Western Railroad and the Central New York Railroad are the only remaining railroads owned by the Delaware Otsego Corporation.

The Delaware Otsego Corporation holding company is also a subsidiary, as it is owned by DOCP Acquisition LLC.

History
The Delaware Otsego Corporation was established as the Delaware Otsego Railroad by Syracuse University law school student Walter G. Rich. The company was formed when Walter G. Rich started operating a portion of the New York Central Railroad's Catskill Mountain Branch (Ulster and Delaware Railroad). The NYC cut back operations to Bloomville in July 1965, after which Rich acquired 2.6 miles of the line eastward from Oneonta, NY to Mickle Bridge. To operate the line, he formed the Delaware Otsego Railroad. The company, while operating a portion of the Catskill Mountain Branch, was often called the "DO Line". The company used a former Virginia Blue Ridge Railway 0-6-0 steam locomotive to operate the line. Train rides were offered between the passenger station (located near the interchange with Delaware and Hudson Railway) and the end of track at Mickle Bridge. Occasional freight service was provided as well. The state condemned the right of way for construction of Interstate 88 through Oneonta and, with the settlement money, Walter Rich and his Delaware Otsego Railroad were searching for the next railroad operation.

In 1971, the Delaware and Hudson Railway was looking to abandon its Cooperstown Branch, which ran 16 miles from Cooperstown Junction near Colliersville, New York, to Cooperstown. With operations on the Catskill Mountain Branch in nearby Oneonta drawing to a close, the company began looking for a new home. After successful negotiations, the company purchased the Cooperstown Branch from D&H and revived the line's original name, the Cooperstown and Charlotte Valley Railroad (CACV). To revive the original name of the Cooperstown Branch, the Delaware Otsego Railroad formed a new Cooperstown and Charlotte Valley Railroad company, and the Delaware Otsego went from a railroad to a holding company. With the Delaware Otsego reviving the Cooperstown and Charlotte Valley Railroad name, the Delaware Otsego Railroad was renamed Delaware Otsego Corporation to reflect its new status as a railroad holding company, while attaining the new Cooperstown and Charlotte Valley Railroad. Delaware Otsego went on to acquire the Fonda, Johnstown & Gloversville Railroad, the Lackawaxen and Stourbridge Railroad, the Staten Island Railway, the Rahway Valley Railroad, the Toledo, Peoria and Western Railway, the Central New York Railroad and the New York, Susquehanna and Western Railroad. In 1980, the Delaware Otsego formed the Kingston Terminal Railroad (KTER) to operate the east end of the former NYC Catskill Mountain Branch between Kingston, New York, and Rondout. Customers never materialized, and the operation never turned a wheel.

On October 3, 1997, DOCP Acquisition LLC announced that it had completed the short-form merger of Delaware Otsego Corporation (NASDAQ:DOCP) with a wholly-owned subsidiary via a stock tender offer of $22 per share. This deal brought the Delaware Otsego Corporation, including its primary subsidiary New York, Susquehanna and Western Railway, under control of the much-larger Norfolk Southern and CSX rail systems, due to ten percent of DOCP Acquisition LLC being acquired by Norfolk Southern, ten percent acquired by CSX, while the rest was owned by Walter G. Rich of the Delaware Otsego Corporation.
On 9 August 2007, Rich died after an eight-month struggle against pancreatic cancer, at the age of 61. Immediately afterward, NYS&W shrank its operations, with lucrative traffic being siphoned-off to CSX and NS, all passenger operations canceled and equipment sold. The railroad currently operates a set of freight trains between Syracuse, New York and North Bergen, New Jersey. The railroad is also host to an occasional detour of trains when derailments or heavy traffic block the CSX mainline across New York State.

Current Railroads

New York, Susquehanna and Western Railway 

In 1980, the state of New Jersey approached Walter Rich and asked him to take over operation of the nearly-dead New York, Susquehanna and Western Railway (NYSW). In 1982, Conrail petitioned to abandon the former EL branches from Binghamton to Syracuse and Utica. DO acquired these lines and organized them as the Northern Division of the NYS&W. Soon after, portions of the former Lehigh and Hudson River Railway between Warwick, New York, and Sparta Jct., New Jersey, were purchased, and the western end of the NYSW was re-opened. Trackage rights over Conrail from Warwick to Binghamton were secured, creating a new through route from Syracuse to the New Jersey terminal waterfront at Little Ferry. The CNYK was integrated into the Northern Division at this time. The railroad was aggressively marketed as an alternative through route to New York City markets, operating lucrative intermodal double-stack trains starting in 1986. The NYSW quickly grew to become the flagship of DO.

Central New York Railroad 

State funds were made available to rehabilitate the line in 1974, and regular freight service was operated. This line split off from the Utica Branch, and interchanged with the EL (later Conrail). When DO acquired the Utica and Syracuse branches from Conrail, the CNYK was integrated into the newly christened Northern Division. Service was suspended in 1988, and the line was abandoned in 1998 after years of disuse. The CNYK name was reactivated by the New York, Susquehanna & Western in 2004, when it was assigned to the Port Jervis-Binghamton segment of the Southern Tier Line, leased from Norfolk Southern.

Former Railroads

Cooperstown & Charlotte Valley Railroad 

With Delaware Otsego operations on the Catskill Mountain Branch in nearby Oneonta drawing to a close, the company was looking for a new home. The Delaware Otsego acquired the Cooperstown Branch in 1971 from the Delaware & Hudson which ran  from Cooperstown Junction (near Colliersville, NY) to Cooperstown. After successful negotiations, the company purchased the Cooperstown Branch from D&H and revived its original name, the Cooperstown and Charlotte Valley Railroad (CACV) by forming a new Cooperstown and Charlotte Valley Railroad company.

A former D&H RS-2 was purchased (#4022), and repainted and renumbered as #100.  Diesel and steam excursions were operated for about five years, along with freight service.  The last regular freight service was operated in December, 1987, and the line was embargoed afterwards.  It was used for freight-car storage before being sold to the Leatherstocking Chapter, NRHS in 1996, which 
has since rebuilt portions of the line and offers seasonal tourist service. As of 2022, rehabilitation is in progress to reopen the entire line between Cooperstown Junction and Cooperstown, with new service planned to continue south of Milford to the NS connection.

Fonda, Johnstown & Gloverville Railroad 

In 1975, DO purchased the Fonda, Johnstown and Gloversville Railroad (FJG) and managed to turn it around into a profitable operation. The recession of the early 1980s took its toll, and the railroad was shut down in 1984. A final run with a Trackmobile was made in 1988 to clear the line of any remaining railroad equipment. Most of the FJ&G route has been converted into a rail trail.

Lackawaxen & Stourbridge Railroad 

The Erie Lackawanna suffered severe damage as a result of flooding from Hurricane Agnes in 1972, forcing the company into bankruptcy and reorganization. By 1974, it was clear that the Honesdale Branch was not to be included in the Conrail plan, despite having many customers on the line. Officials from Wayne County campaigned to save the line, and searched for an operator to take over the branch. In March, 1976, the DO was approached with the possibility of operating the line, and expressed interest. The Lackawaxen and Stourbridge Railroad (LASB) was created to operate this branch, and a special order was handed down from the ICC directing operation of the line until a purchase agreement could be worked out. The first LASB train departed on April 1, 1976. The railroad enjoyed various forms of success operating passenger excursions as well as regular freight service. In 1989, the DO bowed-out and the newly formed Stourbridge Railroad (SBRR) took over. A flood in 2005 severed the line, and a failed attempt by Morristown and Erie Railroad to operate the line resulted in the abandonment of all operations in 2012. Ten years later (2022), however, the entire railroad sees passenger service under new ownership, as "The Stourbridge Line".

Staten Island Railway 

The earliest portions of the Staten Island Railway were built in 1860, connecting the ferry landing at Tompkinsville with the village of Tottenville, New York. Looking to expand into the New York City area, the Baltimore & Ohio Railroad purchased the line in 1885. The B&O financed the construction of new ferry terminals and slips at St. George, as well as a branch along the north shore of the island to connect to New Jersey via a bridge over the Arthur Kill. Known as the Staten Island Rapid Transit, the line provided freight and passenger service to the island, and the passenger service was electrified in 1925. In 1971, the rapid transit passenger operations were turned over to the Staten Island Rapid Transit Operating Authority: a division of New York's Metropolitan Transportation Authority.

The B&O and successors Chessie System and CSX Transportation continued to operate freight service on the island until 1985, when SIRT was sold to the Delaware Otsego Corp. Operated as the Staten Island Railway (SIRY), mostly with spare equipment and crews from the Susquehanna, little was accomplished in the way of improvements. Crews were based out of Arlington Yard, and sometimes would be called to work the neighboring Rahway Valley Railroad, acquired by DO in 1986. One of the last regular freight moves off Staten Island took place in March, 1991. The railroad filed for abandonment in December, 1991, and AK Drawbridge was left locked in the raised position. The lines on Staten Island were subsequently transferred to the New York City Economic Development Corp. and the Port Authority of New York and New Jersey, which have restored the bridge and developed ExpressRail to service the Howland Hook Marine Terminal.

Rahway Valley Railroad 

Never turning a profit, the line closed and was sold at foreclosure in 1901. The New Orange Four Junction Railroad was formed to take over the NY&O in 1901, and was looking to expand to Summit, New Jersey. This project failed as well, and the NY&O and the NOFJ were combined into the new Rahway Valley Railroad (RVRR) in 1904. By 1906, the railroad was extended to Summit, but interchange with the Delaware, Lackawanna and Western Railroad would not be established until 1931. The railroad experienced its share of rise and decline between the wars, but managed to remain profitable through the postwar era. The formation of Conrail in 1976 took away the railroad's competitive connections, and an 
increasing number of railroad customers were switching to trucks.

Delaware Otsego acquired the venerable Rahway Valley Railroad in 1986 after it was unable to secure liability insurance. Freight traffic had dropped-off significantly by this time, and service was frequently provided by Staten Island Railway (SIRY) crews. Primary interchange was moved to the former CNJ connection at Cranford, New Jersey. After years of declining traffic levels, DO shut down the RV in 1992. The remaining property was acquired by Union County in 1994. On May 9, 2002, the Morristown & Erie Railway entered into a 10-year operating agreement with Union County to acquire and rehabilitate the remaining RVRR and SIRY lines in New Jersey.

Brief ownership of Toledo, Peoria & Western Railway 

In 1995, the NYSW acquired a 40% interest in the Toledo, Peoria and Western Railway (TPW), with full control going to DO in 1996. During this time, this regional railroad that operates in Illinois and Indiana was dispatched from the DO offices in Cooperstown, New York. Some TPW locomotives were painted in the Susquehanna's distinctive yellow-and-black paint scheme during this time. The TPW was acquired by RailAmerica in 1999.

Delaware Otsego railroad ownership timeline
 Current
 New York, Susquehanna & Western Railroad (1980)
 Central New York Railroad (1973)
 Former
 Cooperstown & Charlotte Valley Railroad (1971)
 Fonda, Johnstown & Gloversville Railroad (1974)
 Staten Island Railway (1985)
 Rahway Valley Railroad (1986)
Toledo, Peoria & Western Railway (1996)
 Never materialized
 Kingston Terminal Railroad (1980)

References

United States railroad holding companies
Companies based in New York (state)